The 2012–13 Borussia Dortmund season was the 104th season in the club's football history. In 2012–13 the club played in the Bundesliga, the top tier of German football. It was the club's 37th consecutive season in this league, having been promoted from the 2. Bundesliga in 1976.

Review and events

The 2012–13 Borussia Dortmund season started on 18 August 2012 with a win against FC Oberneuland. Borussia Dortmund qualified for the 2012–13 UEFA Champions League and were scheduled against Ajax, Manchester City and Real Madrid. The club's opening league match was against Werder Bremen on 25 August and their opening Champions League match was against Ajax on 18 September. Hamburger SV end the club's 31-match unbeaten streak on 22 September. On 30 April, Borussia Dortmund qualified for the 2013 UEFA Champions League Final. However, Real Madrid manager José Mourinho was critical of referee Howard Webb of not giving Mats Hummels a red card after handling the ball. Cristiano Ronaldo would have had a breakaway if not for the handball. Mourinho claimed that Webb spared Hummels for the Champions League Final.

Competitions

Overall

Friendlies

Pre-season

Pre-season friendlies

Liga-total-Cup

Mid-season friendlies

Bundesliga

League table

Results summary

Results by round

Matches

DFB-Pokal

DFL-Supercup

UEFA Champions League

Group stage

Knockout phase

Round of 16

Quarter-finals

Semi-finals

Final

Squad information

Squad and statistics

|}

Goal scorers

All competitions

Bundesliga

DFB-Pokal

Champions League

|-
|()* = Goals in DFL Supercup
|-
| colspan="12"|Last updated: 26 May 2013
|-

Transfers

In:

Out:

On loan

For recent transfers, see List of German football transfers summer 2012 and List of German football transfers winter 2011–12.

Winter transfers

In:

Out:

}

Borussia Dortmund II

Sources

External links
 2012–13 Borussia Dortmund season at Weltfussball.de 
 2012–13 Borussia Dortmund season at kicker.de 
 2012–13 Borussia Dortmund season at Fussballdaten.de 

Borussia Dortmund
Borussia Dortmund
Borussia Dortmund seasons